Uverworld (stylized as UVERworld) is a Japanese rock band consisting of six members and originating from Kusatsu, Shiga. They have released eleven studio albums and over thirty singles and have sold over three million records worldwide. 

"Uverworld" is a term coined by the band members, combining the German word "über" (meaning "over") with the English word "world" to form a phrase that means "crossing above the world".

History

2000–2005: Beginnings and debut
The six-member band known as Uverworld first formed in 2002, and were known as Sound Goku Road, (more popularly known as "Sangoku Road" in the independent music scene). The band originally consisted of seven members, and released Prime'03, a demo CD which ended up selling 3,000 copies. Unfortunately, Ryohei, the original lead vocalist, left the band. After Ryohei's departure, Ace∞Trigger renamed himself TAKUYA∞ and they changed the name to UVERworld following Akira's idea. At the band's major debut, the saxophonist Seika was rejected by their record label, and could not debut together with the rest as a full band member. He remained as a support member until his hard-earned return in 2014.

According to an interview with the band, there was another vocalist who left the band. However, this vocalist has not yet been identified. Seika is the only one of the two credited on the demo CD and pictured with very early live photos of the band pre-Uverworld.

The year 2005 was the year that the band signed with the label Gr8! Records, which is under Sony Music Records. The band made their debut with the single "D-tecnolife", which was the second opening theme for the anime Bleach. The single made its debut in the Oricon charts at the fourth spot with 32,000 copies together with Mr. Children's twenty-seventh single,  on the top spot. The single then later dropped to seventh place in the second week with 16,306 copies sold. The third week in the Oricon charts saw the single dropped 2 places to the ninth spot with 13,761 copies. The single lasted five weeks in the Top 30 weekly singles ranking. The single's sales and  downloads were certified gold by the Recording Industry Association of Japan.

Three months later, Uverworld's second single, "Chance!" was used as the commercial and opening theme for second PSP game of Bleach: Heat the Soul series. The band's second single first entered the Oricon charts on the fifth spot with 14,150 copies. The single later dropped to the 23rd spot selling 6,360 copies on the second week. The single's ranking remained the same, however the number of copies sold on the third week was fewer than the previous week with 5,495 copies. The single only managed to stay on the Top 30 weekly singles ranking for three weeks.

2006–2008: Timeless, Bugright and Proglution
On January 25, 2006, the band's third single "Just Melody" ended up at number-seventeen on the Oricon charts. Three weeks later Uverworld's first album Timeless was released, breaking the Top 10 at number-five and selling 60,000 copies. Seika made a brief return during this album, playing saxophone for track 5, "Yasashisa no Shizuku" (優しさの雫). After a three-month break, Uverworld released "Colors of the Heart" as the third opening theme for Blood+, an anime series based on the animated movie, Blood: The Last Vampire. The single debuted at number-three and was the highest position any of Uverworld's singles had reached up to that time.

Their fifth single, entitled "Shamrock", was released on August 2, 2006, and was used as the ending theme for the drama Dance Drill, a show about a group of girls who aspire to become cheerleaders. Uverworld's sixth single was released on November 15, 2006, entitled "Kimi no Suki na Uta", the song was used as the theme song for the TBS TV show Koi Suru Hanikami! or Honey Coming! from the broadcast of October until December. It reached number two on the Oricon charts, which was the second highest place for an Uverworld single so far until it fell off of the charts three and a half weeks later. It sold around 79,659 copies according to the Oricon sales charts.

On February 21, 2007, Uverworld released their second album titled Bugright. It featured the singles Uverworld had released after Timeless.  was included in the tribute soundtrack titled as The Songs for Death Note The Movie: The Last Name Tribute for Death Note. On March 6, 2007, the band was also part of an event called 'We Love Music Vol.2' held in the Shibuya-AX where Uverworld performed against Sid.

The band's third album, titled Proglution, was released on January 16, 2008 and contain full eighteen tracks. The album was released in a CD-only version and a limited edition that includes an extra DVD. Proglution sold over 150,000 copies. June 11, 2008 saw the release of the single "Gekidō/Just Break the Limit!". "Gekidō" was used as the fourth opening theme of the anime series D.Gray-man while the song "Just Break the Limit!" was used as a support song for Pocari Sweat's CM. "Hakanaku mo Towa no Kanashi" was used as the opening for the second season of the Mobile Suit Gundam 00 anime. The single became the band's first number-one single on Oricon, with approximately 181,784 copies sold. The single has since gone on to become the highest selling single from the band.

2009: Awakeve
On February 18, 2009 the band released their fourth album titled Awakeve. The album sold over 115,000 copies on its first week, and ranked number-two on the Oricon album chart. A DVD of their live performance in Nippon Budokan was released on April 29, 2009. The band's thirteenth single was released on August 5, 2009 titled as "Go-On." The single's title track was featured as the second ending theme on the Japanese broadcast of the first season of House. The band performed at 2009's Inazuma Rock Festival held in Shiga Prefecture. They also released their fourth DVD of the Awakeve Tour 09 on September 30, 2009.

The band's fourteenth single was released on October 28, 2009 entitled  for the Tokyo Broadcasting System drama Shōkōjo Seira, based on the children's novel, A Little Princess written by Frances Hodgson Burnett. The song's lyrics was written by Takuya and was co-composed by both the lyricist and Satoru Hiraide while the arrangement was done by the band and Hiraide. On October 9, 2009, an English official website was announced and it went online at 12pm Japan Standard Time.

A best of album titled Neo Sound Best was announced on November 9, 2009 and released on December 9, 2009. They were also scheduled to perform at the 2010 Ontama Carnival together with Funky Monkey Babys and Flumpool.

2010–2012: Last and Life 6 Sense
Their fifteenth single "Gold" was released on March 31, 2010, making it their first release of the year. The music video for "Gold" was made into 3-D, making it the first 3-D music video in Japan. It was premiered on April 17, 2010. Additionally, their fifth album Last was released two weeks later on April 14, 2010. Their sixteenth single  was released on September 15, 2010, and contains the ending theme song for the Mobile Suit Gundam 00 movie and the title song for the PSP game Last Ranker.

Their seventeenth single "No.1" was released on November 24, 2010. "No.1" was featured as their opening song for their concert Last Tour Final at Tokyo Dome on November 27, 2010. Their eighteenth single "Mondo Piece" was to be released on March 23, 2011. However, due to the 2011 Tōhoku earthquake and tsunami, the release date was pushed back to April 6. It was also previewed at an earlier concert at the Tokyo Dome as their final song. Their nineteenth single "Core Pride" was selected to be the 1st opening theme for the anime Blue Exorcist.

The band released their sixth album Life 6 Sense on June 1, 2011. The album's title was leaked out in bands page on Japanese Wikipedia and the following month the band released their 6th DVD titled Last Tour Final at Tokyo Dome 2010/11/27. On December 14, 2011, the band released their twentieth single (second A-side single) entitled "Baby Born & Go/Kinjito". Blu-ray versions of UVERworld 2008 Premium Live at Nippon Budokan and Last Tour Final at Tokyo Dome were released on December 17, 2011.

On March 28, 2012, UVERworld released their 21st single entitled "7th Trigger" and 6 days later they released another Live DVD & Blu-ray UVERworld 2011 Premium Live on Xmas at Nippon Budokan which was at April 4, 2012.

2012–2014: The One
On August 8, 2012, the band released their 22nd single "The Over" which was used as the ending theme of Kuro no Onna Kyoushi (黒の女教師). Three months later on November 28, 2012, the band released their 7th album entitled The One. After the release of 7th album, Uverworld released a re-cut single from their latest album entitled "Reversi". It was used as the movie theme song for Blue Exorcist -The Movie.

On August 14, 2013, the band released their 24th single "Fight for Liberty / Wizard Club'" as their first single of 2013. "Fight for Liberty" was used as the opening theme song for the anime Space Battleship Yamato 2199, while "Wizard Club" was used as the ending theme song for the TV series Kaikin! Bakuro Night.

On November 6, 2013, Uverworld release their 10th video and their first full "Men's Festival" concert footage Kings's Parade Zepp DiverCity (2013.02.08) on DVD and Blu-ray after their long period of The One Tour 2012–2013. Uverworld finally decided to have the full Live House Footage from Zepp DiverCity as their main concept instead of arenas, stadiums or halls. On December 18, 2013, the band released their 25th single "Nano-Second" (ナノ・セカンド) which was their second and last single of 2013.

On March 19, 2014, they released their 2nd video album UVERworld Video Complete -Act.2- from Life 6 Sense to The One promotional videos which also includes a Live bonus disc from 2013.12.25 Arena Live 2013 Winter Queen's Party at Nippon Budokan.

On March 26, 2014, it was announced that Uverworld would have their former member from Sangoku Road and live support member, Seika as their new 6th member to the group. On March 27, 2014, the band officially announced their next major concert would take place on July 5 2014 at Kyocera Dome Osaka.

2014–2017: Ø Choir
On June 18, 2014, Uverworld released their 26th single titled "Nanokame no Ketsui" (7日目の決意, "Decision of the Seventh Day") as their 1st single in 2014. Two weeks later, they released a new album entitled Ø Choir, which subsequently reached second place on the Oricon chart with 84,810 copies sold in its first week release. The album contains 14 tracks including a cover of "Born Slippy" originally by Welsh electronic music group Underworld. Two versions of the album were released: one regular and one limited edition with the latter including a DVD which contains 50 minutes of previously unreleased footage. On August 19, the band announced their new 12th DVD King's Parade Nippon Budokan 2013.12.26, released on September 24, 2014.

On May 27, Uverworld released their 27th single "Boku no Kotoba Dewanai Kore wa Bokutachi no Kotoba" (僕の言葉ではない これは僕達の言葉, "Not My Words, This is Our Words"). The single was used for the anime series The Heroic Legend of Arslan. On August 26, they released another single titled "I Love the World" which was chosen as the theme song for the game Dragon Nest R in Japan. On September 30, 2015, the band released their 14th video content on DVD/Blu-ray titled King's Parade at Yokohama Arena 2015.01.10.

On June 8, 2016, Uverworld released their 12th video content on Blu-ray and DVD Uverworld 15&10 Anniversary Live which includes two concerts "15&10 Anniversary Live" recorded on September 3 and their first "Women's festival" footage recorded on September 6. Then a month later on July 27, Uverworld release their 29th single "We are Go / All Alone". Three months later on November 6, Uverworld released their 13th video footage entitled Uverworld Premium Live on Xmas 2015 at Nippon Budokan.

On December 17, 2016, the Blue Exorcist official website revealed several new promo trailers for its upcoming second season where it was revealed that Uverworld would again be providing the opening song for the series. "Itteki no Eikyō" (一滴の影響, "Drop's Influence") was released on February 1, 2017. Their 31st single "Decided" was featured on the live-action film Gintama.

2017–present: Tycoon
On August 2, 2017, Uverworld released their 9th studio album Tycoon, three years and a month since their previous album. Originally they planned to include 20 new songs in the album, resulting in a recording time of about 90 minutes, which exceeded the time limit for the album. Eventually they decided to cut it down to 81 minutes by putting it in a single coupling and recorded tracks. Various parts of the album were cut and it fell within 78 minutes 59 seconds, to be adjusted before release. Despite the changes, their latest album was a success and ranked first in the Oricon Daily ranking within two days of its release. Their new album contains 18 tracks along with a limited edition bonus CD that includes recordings of their live performances.

On March 14, 2018, the band released their 4th "Men's Festival" concert recording entitled Uverworld King's Parade 2017 Saitama Super Arena. On May 2, 2018, they released 32nd single titled "Odd Future" which was chosen as the first opening theme for the third season of the anime series My Hero Academia. It peaked at number three on the Oricon chart, and reached fifth place on the Billboard Japan Hot 100. On November 7, 2018, they released a new single "Good and Evil / Eden e". "Good and Evil" was used for the Japanese dubbed version of Marvel's film Venom which was theatrically released in Japan on November 2, 2018.

On January 16, 2019, Uverworld released their 18th video album on DVD & Blu-ray titled Uverworld Tycoon Tour at Yokohama Arena 2017.12.21. It includes full live footage from their "Men vs. Women Festival" concert on vocalist TAKUYA∞'s birthday. A month later, UVERworld released a new single on February 27, 2019. It contains the song "Touch Off" and its instrumental version, and a song titled "ConneQt". "Touch Off" was used as the opening theme of the 2019 anime The Promised Neverland.

Band members

Current members
 Takuya∞ (born December 21, 1979 in Osaka) — vocals, rap, programming
 Katsuya (克哉, born on February 22, 1980) — guitar, leader
 Akira (彰, born on March 8, 1984) — guitar, programming
 Nobuto (信人, born on February 14, 1980) — bass guitar
 Shintarō (真太郎, born on November 5, 1983 in Ōtsu, Shiga) — drums
 Seika (誠果, born on September 25, 1979 in Kusatsu, Shiga) — manipulator, saxophone

Discography

Albums

Studio albums

Compilation albums

Singles

Video albums

Guest appearances

Awards and nominations

Notes

References

External links
 Official site
 

Gr8! Records artists
Japanese alternative rock groups
Japanese pop rock music groups
Musical groups established in 2000
Musical quintets
Anime musical groups
Musical groups from Shiga Prefecture
2000 establishments in Japan